Iran Football's 2nd Division 2000–01 season was played in three groups of nine teams each. The top two teams from each group Promoted second Round, and the top two each group – Aboomoslem and Malavan – gained promotion to the Iran Pro League.

First round results

Group 1

Group 2

Group 3

Second round

References

 www.rsssf.com

League 2 (Iran) seasons
Iran
2000–01 in Iranian football